The Age of Revolution is a period from the late-18th to the mid-19th centuries during which a number of significant revolutionary movements occurred in most of Europe and the Americas. The period is noted for the change from absolutist monarchies to representative governments with a written constitution, and the creation of nation states.

Influenced by the new ideas of the Enlightenment, the American Revolution (1765–1783) is usually considered the starting point of the Age of Revolution. It in turn inspired the French Revolution of 1789, which rapidly spread to the rest of Europe through its wars. In 1799, Napoleon took power in France and continued the French Revolutionary Wars by conquering most of continental Europe. Although Napoleon imposed on his conquests several modern concepts such as equality before the law, or a civil code, his rigorous military occupation triggered national rebellions, notably in Spain and Germany. After Napoleon's defeat, European great powers forged the Holy Alliance at the Congress of Vienna in 1814–15, in an attempt to prevent future revolutions, and also restored the previous monarchies. Nevertheless, Spain was considerably weakened by the Napoleonic Wars and could not control its American colonies, almost all of which proclaimed their independence between 1810 and 1820. Revolution then spread back to southern Europe in 1820, with uprisings in Portugal, Spain, Italy, and Greece. Continental Europe was shaken by two similar revolutionary waves in 1830 and 1848, also called the Spring of Nations. The democratic demands of the revolutionaries often merged with independence or national unification movements, such as in Italy, Germany, Poland, Hungary, etc. The violent repression of the Spring of Nations marked the end of the era.

The expression was popularized by the British historian Eric Hobsbawm in his book The Age of Revolution: Europe 1789–1848, published in 1962.

Industrial Revolution

The Industrial Revolution was the transition to new manufacturing processes in the period from about 1760 to sometime between 1820 and 1840. It marked a major turning point in history and almost every aspect of daily life was influenced in some way. In particular, average income and population began to exhibit unprecedented sustained growth. This led to a rapid expansion of cities that resulted in social strains and disturbances. For instance, economic grievances associated with this industrialization fed later revolutions such as those that transpired from 1848. New social classes emerged including those that began to reject orthodox politics. This is demonstrated by the rise of the urban middle class, which became a powerful force so that they had to be integrated into the political system. The upheavals also led to old political ideas that were directed against the social arrangements of the preindustrial regime.

American Revolution (1765–1783)

The American Revolution brought about independence for the Thirteen Colonies of British America. This was the first European colony to claim independence. It was the birth of the United States of America, ultimately leading to the drafting and ratification of a U.S. Constitution that included a number of original features within a federated representative democracy and a system of separation of powers and checks and balances. Those include but are not limited to an elected head of state, property rights, due process rights, and the rights of free speech, the press and religious practice.

French Revolution (1789–1799)
The British historian Eric Hobsbawm credits the French Revolution with giving the 19th century its ideology and politics, stating:France made its revolutions and gave them their ideas, to the point where a tricolour of some kind became the emblem of virtually every emerging nation, and European (or indeed world) politics between 1789 and 1917 were largely the struggle for and against the principles of 1789, or the even more incendiary ones of 1793. France provided the vocabulary and the issues of liberal and radical-democratic politics for most of the world. France provided the first great example, the concept and the vocabulary of nationalism. France provided the codes of law, the model of scientific and technical organization, the metric system of measurement for most countries. The ideology of the modern world first penetrated the ancient civilizations which had hitherto resisted European ideas through French influence. This was the work of the French Revolution.

The French Revolution was a period of radical social and political upheaval in France from 1789 to 1799 that profoundly affected French and modern history, marking the decline of powerful monarchies and churches and the rise of democracy and nationalism. Popular resentment of the privileges enjoyed by the clergy and aristocracy grew amidst an economic crisis following two expensive wars and years of bad harvests, motivating demands for change. These were couched in terms of Enlightenment ideals and caused the convocation of the Estates-General in May 1789.

The precipitating event was that King went public that the French state was essentially bankrupt, and because of that he convened the États généraux (Estates general) to replenish state coffers. The Estates-General was made up of 3 estates/orders:

 1st Estate: Clergy
 2nd Estate: Nobility
 3rd Estate: Wealthier, better educated non-nobility (commoners)

King's weakened position 
The French tax regime was regressive, and traditional noble and bourgeois allies felt shut out.

Centralizing monarchical power, i.e. Royal absolutism, onward from Louis XIII in 1614 inward to the royal court in Versailles led to a snowball effect that ended up alienating both nobility and bourgeoisie. There was a tendency to play favorites with the tax regime, especially by exempting nobility from taxation. This led to a feeling of discrimination among the bourgeoisie, which itself was an engine of the Revolution

It was also a question of numbers. The population of nobles versus that of the rest of France wildly disparate: nobles = .4-1.5% out of total population of ca. 28 million. The population of clergy versus the rest of France was even less: about 120,000 clergy total, out of which were 139 powerful and wealthy bishops (.0005% of total pop.); the majority of parish priests were as poor as their parishioners.

Bourgeoisie 
These were young men from commoner families who were not sustenance farmers and whose families could afford to send their sons to either study the law or take over the family business. When talking about these young (mainly) lawyers from this segment of society, one is also talking about products of the Enlightenment. As the former Financial Times chief foreign affairs columnist and author Ian Davidson puts it:“French society, like others in much of Western Europe, was undergoing a colossal transformation. The ultra-intellectual Enlightenment of Montesquieu and Voltaire, Bach and Mozart, Isaac Newton and Adam Smith was just the tip of a vast change that was happening throughout society and producing an expanding, educated, literate and ambitious bourgeoisie.”Part of this ambition was to enter a political scene that was always locked behind a door to which only the monarchy, clergy, and nobility had the keys. The durable shift here was that, by the time the Estates general convened, their knowledge of law gave them the tools to enter the political scene.

Constitutional chronology 
 Ancien Régime (pre–1789)
 National Constituent Assembly (1789–1791)
 Constitutional Monarchy (1791–1792)
 National Legislative Assembly (1791–1792)
 First Republic (1792–1804)
 National Convention (1792–1795)
 Directory (1795–1799)
 Consulate (1799–1804)
 First Empire, the reign of Napoleon (1804–1814)

Haitian Revolution (1791–1804)

The Haitian Revolution was a Slave rebellion slave revolt in the French colony of Saint-Domingue, which culminated in the elimination of slavery there and the founding of the Republic of Haiti. The Haitian Revolution was the only slave revolt which led to the founding of a state. Furthermore, it is generally considered the most successful slave rebellion ever to have occurred and as a defining moment in the histories of both Europe and the Americas. The rebellion began with a revolt of black African slaves in August 1791. It ended in November 1803 with the French defeat at the Battle of Vertières. Haiti became an independent country on January 1, 1804.

One-third of French overseas trade and revenue came from Haitian sugar and coffee plantations. During the French Revolution the island was ignored, allowing the revolt to have some initial successes. However, after Napoleon became the first consul of France, he sent troops to suppress the revolt.

The war was known for cruelty on both sides, and extensive guerrilla warfare. French forces showed no mercy, as they were fighting blacks, who were not considered to be worthy opponents of the French army.

The French army suffered from severe outbreaks of disease, and the Haitians were under-equipped. Top leaders of both sides were killed, and the leader of the Haitians died in captivity.

United Irishmen's Rebellion (1798)

In 1798, a revolt broke out against British rule in Ireland in the hopes of creating an independent Irish republic. The rebellion was initiated by the Society of United Irishmen and led by Theobald Wolfe Tone. The revolt was motivated by a combination of factors, including Irish nationalism, news of the success of the French Revolution, and resentment at the British-instituted Penal laws, which discriminated against Catholics and Presbyterians in Ireland. The rebellion failed and led to the Act of Union in 1801.

Serbian Revolution (1804–1835) 

The Serbian Revolution was a national uprising and constitutional change in Serbia that took place between 1804 and 1835, during which the territory evolved from an Ottoman province into a rebel territory, a constitutional monarchy, and finally the modern Serbian state. The first part of the period, from 1804 to 1815, was marked by a violent struggle for independence from the Ottoman Empire with three armed uprisings taking place(The First Serbian Uprising, Hadži Prodan's rebellion and the Second Serbian Uprising), ending with a ceasefire. During the later period (1815–1835) a peaceful consolidation of political power developed in the increasingly autonomous Serbia, culminating in the recognition of the right to hereditary rule by Serbian princes in 1830 and 1833 and the territorial expansion of the young monarchy. The adoption of the first written Constitution in 1835 abolished feudalism and serfdom, and made the country suzerain. The term "Serbian Revolution" was coined by a German academic historiographer, Leopold von Ranke, in his book Die Serbische Revolution, published in 1829. These events marked the foundation of the modern Principality of Serbia.

Scholars have characterized the Serbian War of Independence and subsequent national liberation as a revolution because the uprisings were started by broad masses of rural Serbian people who were in severe class conflict with the Turkish landowners as a political and economic masters at the same time, similar to Greece in 1821–1832.

Latin American Wars of Independence (1808–1833)

Latin America experienced independence revolutions in the early 19th century that separated the colonies from Spain and Portugal, creating new nations. These movements were generally led by the ethnically Spanish but locally born Creole class; these were often wealthy citizens that held high positions of power but were still poorly respected by the European-born Spaniards. One such Creole was Simón Bolívar, who led several revolutions throughout South America and helped establish Gran Colombia. Another important figure was José de San Martín, who helped create the United Provinces of the Río de la Plata and became the first president of Peru.

Greek War of Independence (1821–1832)

Greece in the early 1800s was under the rule of the Ottoman Empire. A series of revolts, starting in 1821, began the conflict. The Ottoman Empire sent in forces to suppress the revolts. By 1827, forces from Russia, Great Britain, and France entered the conflict, helping the Greeks drive the Turkish forces off the Peloponnese Peninsula. The Turks finally recognized Greece as a free nation in May 1832.

Revolutions of 1820

The Revolutions of 1820 were a series of revolutionary uprisings in Spain, Italy, Portugal, and Greece. Unlike the wars of 1830, these wars tended to be in the outer regions of Europe.

Revolutions of 1830

A revolutionary wave in Europe which took place in 1830. It included two "romantic nationalist" revolutions, the Belgian Revolution in the United Kingdom of the Netherlands and the July Revolution in France. There also were revolutions in Congress Poland, Italian states, Portugal and Switzerland. It was followed eighteen years later by another and  much stronger wave of revolutions known as the Revolutions of 1848.

Revolutions of 1848

The European Revolutions of 1848, known in some countries as the Spring of Nations, Springtime of the Peoples or the Year of Revolution, were a series of political upheavals throughout Europe in 1848. It remains the most widespread revolutionary wave in European history, but within a year, reactionary forces had regained control, and the revolutions collapsed.

The political impact of the 1848 revolutions was more evident in Austria in comparison to the revolution's effects in countries like Germany. This is attributed to the way the upheavals in Vienna resulted in greater loss of life and gained stronger support from intellectuals, students, and the working class. An account described the German experience as less concerned with national issues, although it succeeded in breaking down class barriers. There was a previously prevalent view that there was only one revolutionary event in Germany but recent scholarship pointed to a fragmented picture of several revolutions happening at the same time.

The 1848 revolutions were also notable because of the increased participation of women. While women rarely participated in revolutionary activities, there were those who performed supportive and auxiliary roles such as the cases of the women's political club in Vienna, which demanded revolutionary measures from the Austrian Constituent Assembly, and the Parisian women who protested and proposed their own solutions to social problems, particularly those involving their rights and crafts.

Taiping Revolution (1850–1864)

The Taiping Rebellion which lasted from 1850 to 1864, was a revolt that was waged against the Qing dynasty in China, and its main causes were religious convictions rather than regional economic conditions. The Taiping forces were led by a cult-like group that was called the God Worshipping Society by its self-proclaimed prophet, Hong Xiuquan. In 1853, they seized the city of Nanjing and occupied it as their kingdom's capital city for a decade. However, the Taiping forces failed to overthrow the Qing dynasty, and when their rebellion was finally crushed in 1864, more than 20 million people were dead.

Eureka Rebellion (1854)

The Eureka Rebellion was a 20-minute shootout between the miners of Ballarat, Victoria, and the British Army. After the imposition of Gold Mining Licences, that being that a person had one of these to mine gold, and which cost 30 shillings a month to own a license, the miners decided that it was too much. So the Ballarat miners started rallies at Bakery Hill and burnt their licenses, took an oath under the flag of the Southern Cross, elected Peter Lalor as their rebellion leader, and built a stockade (a makeshift fort) around the diggings. Eventually, the British troops, led by Governor Charles Hotham of Ballarat fired upon the stockade. The miners fired back and lasted 20 minutes before their stockade was stormed by British troops. Most of the miners were arrested by the British colonial authorities, and taken to trial. If found guilty, they would hang for high treason. All were eventually acquitted. The Eureka Rebellion is controversially identified with the birth of democracy in Australia and interpreted by many as a political revolt.

First War of Indian Independence (1857–1858) 

The Indian Rebellion of 1857 was a major, but ultimately unsuccessful, uprising in India in 1857–58 against the rule of the British East India Company, which functioned as a sovereign power on behalf of the British Crown. The rebellion began on 10 May 1857 in the form of a mutiny of sepoys of the Company's army in the garrison town of Meerut, 40 mi (64 km) northeast of Delhi (that area is now Old Delhi). It then erupted into other mutinies and civilian rebellions chiefly in the upper Gangetic plain and central India, though incidents of revolt also occurred farther north and east. The rebellion posed a considerable threat to British power in that region, and was contained only with the rebels' defeat in Gwalior on 20 June 1858. On 1 November 1858, the British granted amnesty to all rebels not involved in murder, though they did not declare the hostilities to have formally ended until 8 July 1859. Its name is contested, and it is variously described as the Sepoy Mutiny, the Indian Mutiny, the Great Rebellion, the Revolt of 1857, the Indian Insurrection, and the First War of Independence.

Bulgarian revolts and liberation (1869–1878) 

Bulgarian modern nationalism emerged under Ottoman rule in the late 18th and early 19th century, under the influence of western ideas such as liberalism and nationalism, which trickled into the country after the French Revolution. In 1869 the Internal Revolutionary Organization was initiated. An autonomous Bulgarian Exarchate was established in 1870/1872 for the Bulgarian diocese wherein at least two-thirds of Orthodox Christians were willing to join it. The April Uprising of 1876 indirectly resulted in the re-establishment of Bulgaria in 1878.

Paris Commune (1871)

The Paris Commune was a revolutionary socialist government that controlled Paris from 18 March to 28 May 1871. It was established by radicalized defectors from the French National Guard, which had been mobilized to defend Paris in the Franco-Prussian War (19 July 1870 – 28 January 1871).

See also 
 List of revolutions and rebellions
 Atlantic Revolutions
 Modern history
 Long nineteenth century
 Pax Britannica
 Political history of the world
 Risorgimento
 Timeline of national independence

References 

 
18th-century revolutions
19th-century revolutions
Revolution
History of Europe
History of North America
History of South America
18th century in Europe
19th century in Europe
18th century in North America
19th century in North America
18th century in South America
19th century in South America
Revolutionary waves